Vadali may refer to the following places in India :
 Vadali, Gujarat  
 Vadali State, former princely state in Saurashtra region
 Vadali taluka in Idar (Vidhan Sabha constituency), Sabarkantha District, also in Gujarat